is a Japanese news anchor and television personality for NHK. She is the anchor of NHK's morning talk show Asaichi.

Early years 

Suzuki was born in Yokohama, Japan. She attended Hosei University and received a bachelor's degree in social sciences.

Career 
During college, Suzuki joined Hosei University's Jishu Masukomi Kouza (Independent Mass Media Course). At the same time, she attended announce schools of NTV Events Inc. and TV-Asahi Ask Co. Ltd. to experience broadcasting.

Suzuki was hired by NHK in April 2004. She was sent to NHK Takamatsu Broadcasting Station at Takamatsu, Kagawa Prefecture to start her broadcasting career. Two years later, she was relocated to Matsuyama Broadcasting Station in Matsuyama, Ehime Prefecture. She served as Ambassador for Promotion of Digital Terrestrial Broadcasting for both of these stations and Okayama Broadcasting Station.

In 2008, Suzuki was relocated to Tokyo Announcement Room to be the anchor of the regional TV program Shutoken Network airing exclusively in Tokyo Metropolis and peripheral prefectures. From March 2010, she was the anchor of NHK News Ohayō Nippon until March 2015.

Suzuki then served as the anchor of News Watch 9 from March 2015 for two years.

In April 2017, Suzuki became the anchor of the weekday edition of the primetime news show NHK News 7,  which was considered as one of NHK's most highlighted news programs. From October to November 2018, she was suddenly absent from the program because of sickness. She was then an expectant mother and chose to step down the post of the anchor to take maternity leave.

Suzuki returned to NHK to host its morning infotainment program Asaichi replacing Yurie Omi on March 29, 2021.

Personal life 
Suzuki got married with a director working for TBS on November 22, 2012. She gave birth to a daughter on May 18, 2019.

References

External links 
 Naoko Suzuki, NHK Announcement Room

|-

|-

|-

1982 births
Living people
Japanese announcers
Japanese journalists
Hosei University alumni
People from Yokohama
People from Kanagawa Prefecture